The Abelson helper integration site 1 (AHI1) is a protein coding gene that is known for the critical role it plays in brain development.  Proper cerebellar and cortical development in the human brain depends heavily on AHI1.  The AHI1 gene is prominently expressed in the embryonic hindbrain and forebrain.  AHI1 specifically encodes the Jouberin protein and mutations in the expression of the gene is known to cause specific forms of Joubert syndrome.  Joubert syndrome is autosomal recessive and is characterized by the brain malformations and mental retardation that AHI1 mutations have the potential to induce.  AHI1 has also been associated with schizophrenia and autism due to the role it plays in brain development. An AHI1 heterozygous knockout mouse model was studied by Bernard Lerer and his group at Hadassah Medical Center in Jerusalem to elucidate the correlation between alterations in AHI1 expression and the pathogenesis of neuropsychiatric disorders.  The core temperatures and corticosterone secretions of the heterozygous knockout mice after exposure to environmental and visceral stress exhibited extreme repression of autonomic nervous system and hypothalamic-pituitary-adrenal responses.  The knockout mice demonstrated an increased resilience to different types of stress and these results lead to a correlation between emotional regulation and neuropsychiatric disorders.

Jouberin is a protein that in humans is encoded by the AHI1 gene.

References

External links

Further reading